Scratch is an album by pianist Kenny Barron which was recorded in 1985 and released on the German Enja label.

Reception 

In his review on Allmusic, Scott Yanow noted "Kenny Barron, one of those talented pianists who always seems to be underrated, breaks away from playing standards and conventional bebop on this frequently exciting trio date ... The fresh material and close interplay between the musicians make this set one of Barron's best trio recordings to date".

Track listing 
All compositions by Kenny Barron except where noted.

 "Scratch" - 5:20
 "Quiet Times" (Carmen Lundy) – 5:32
 "Water Lillie" - 10:19
 "Song for Abdullah" - 5:33
 "The Third Eyes" - 6:28
 "Jacob's Ladder" (Dave Holland) – 3:37
 "And Then Again" - 5:20

Personnel 
Kenny Barron – piano
Dave Holland – bass (tracks 1-3 & 5-7)
Daniel Humair – drums (tracks 1-3 & 5-7)

References 

Kenny Barron albums
1985 albums
Enja Records albums